Danielle Racquel Scott-Arruda (born October 1, 1972) is an American-Brazilian indoor volleyball player. She has played at the 1996, 2000, 2004, 2008 and the 2012 Summer Olympics, breaking a U.S. female volleyball athlete record for Olympic appearances. She's currently playing professionally for Brazilian league Banana Boat/Praia Clube. Scott-Arruda carried the flag for her native country at the opening ceremony of the 2007 Pan American Games in Rio de Janeiro, Brazil.

High school and personal life

Scott-Arruda was born in Baton Rouge, Louisiana, and attended Woodlawn High School in Baton Rouge, where she was an All-State performer in volleyball and basketball.

Scott-Arruda's parents are Charles Young and Vera Scott. She has one brother (Charles) and one late sister (Stefanie). She was married to Eduardo Arruda. And a daughter Juliánne Scott Arruda. She also loved her high school. She states, " My math teacher never gave up on me she will never be forgetting.".

Long Beach State
Scott was a Three Time First Team American Volleyball Coaches Association (AVCA) All-American and was the National Player of the Year in 1993.

In her career, she posted 1,778 kills, 693 digs and 604 blocks and also earned All-Big West honors in basketball, becoming the first Big West student-athlete to earn all-conference accolades in two sports in one season.

In 1993, she led the 49ers to the NCAA National Championship and won the Honda Sports Award as the top college volleyball player. She was AVCA All-Northwest Region and the Big West Conference Player of the Year, as she led the nation in hitting percentage. In 1992, she was the Big West Conference Player of the Year and helped Long Beach State to the NCAA semifinals. In 1991, she helped Long Beach to the NCAA championship match. In 1994, she won the Honda-Broderick Award (now the Honda Sports Award) as the nation's best female collegiate volleyball player.

Recent international competition
Scott-Arruda has played in 371 international matches, as of August 24, 2008.

2008
Olympic Games (silver medal)
U.S. Olympic exhibition for Brazil
FIVB World Grand Prix (fourth place)
2007
Pan American Games (bronze medal)
FIVB World Grand Prix (eighth place)
NORCECA Championship (silver medal)
FIVB World Cup (bronze medal)
2006
FIVB World Grand Prix (seventh place)
World Championships (ninth place)

Individual awards
 2000 Summer Olympics "Best Blocker"
 2001 FIVB World Grand Prix "Most Valuable Player"
 2001 FIVB World Grand Prix "Best Scorer"
 2001 FIVB World Grand Prix "Best Blocker"
 2002 World Championship "Best Blocker"
 2009 Pan-American Cup "Best Blocker"

Sports Diplomacy 
In 2019, Scott-Arruda visited Fiji as a Sports Envoy for the U.S. State Department's Sports Diplomacy Office.

References

External links
 
 
 
 
 
 

1972 births
Living people
Sportspeople from Baton Rouge, Louisiana
American women's volleyball players
Long Beach State Beach women's volleyball players
Volleyball players at the 1996 Summer Olympics
Volleyball players at the 2000 Summer Olympics
Volleyball players at the 2004 Summer Olympics
Volleyball players at the 2008 Summer Olympics
Volleyball players at the 2007 Pan American Games
Olympic silver medalists for the United States in volleyball
Volleyball players at the 2012 Summer Olympics
Medalists at the 2012 Summer Olympics
Medalists at the 2008 Summer Olympics
Pan American Games silver medalists for the United States
Pan American Games bronze medalists for the United States
Pan American Games medalists in volleyball
Middle blockers
American expatriate sportspeople in Japan
American expatriate sportspeople in Italy
American expatriate sportspeople in Brazil
Expatriate volleyball players in Japan
Expatriate volleyball players in Italy
Expatriate volleyball players in Brazil
Medalists at the 2007 Pan American Games